The Cowboys–Vikings rivalry is a rivalry between the Dallas Cowboys and Minnesota Vikings. One sportswriter named it the fourth-best NFL rivalry of the 1970s.

The overall series is led by Dallas 19–15. The Cowboys and Vikings have played seven times in the playoffs, making this one of the most played playoff series in league history (the Vikings' most common playoff opponent and the fourth-most for the Cowboys after the 49ers, Rams and Packers). The Cowboys lead the playoff series 4–3.

Meetings
 In 1975, the Dallas Cowboys traveled to the Twin Cities for a Divisional playoff game. The Vikings looked to have the game wrapped-up with a late lead 14–10. However, Roger Staubach threw a 50-yard touchdown pass to Drew Pearson in what became known as the Hail Mary game.
In January 1983, future Hall of Fame running back Tony Dorsett rushed for an NFL-record 99-yard touchdown in a Monday Night Football game in Minnesota. This occurred despite the Cowboys have only 10 players in the game, as fullback Robert Newhouse was on the sidelines. The Vikings won the game.
 In 1989, the Minnesota Vikings and Dallas Cowboys were part of the Herschel Walker trade, the largest player trade in NFL history.  In this trade, the Vikings received Herschel Walker and three picks from the Cowboys in exchange for eight picks given to the Cowboys. The Vikings felt it was the last piece needed to make a Super Bowl run. Instead, the trade catapulted the Cowboys to three Super Bowl wins in the 1990s; the Vikings won none with Walker. It is thus considered one of the worst trades in NFL history.
 The 1996 NFC Wild Card Round saw the defending Super Bowl champion Cowboys defeat the Vikings 40–15. That would mark the last time until the 2009 season that the Cowboys would win a postseason game.
 In 1998, the Minnesota Vikings played the Dallas Cowboys on Thanksgiving. Randy Moss, a rookie wide receiver who the Cowboys had passed over due to legal issues in college, famously had three touchdowns in a 46–36 thriller.
 In the 1999 playoffs, the Cowboys traveled to the Hubert H. Humphrey Metrodome for a key wild-card playoff game. The Vikings would win 27–10.
 In 2010, Dallas traveled to the Metrodome for the NFC Divisional playoff game with the Minnesota Vikings. The Vikings defeated the Cowboys 34–3. Late in the game, Cowboys player Keith Brooking was seen arguing with Vikings coaches because he believed the Vikings were running up the score. Cowboys head coach Wade Phillips also believed Minnesota's late-game aggression was uncalled for.
 In 2022, the Cowboys travelled to U.S. Bank Stadium and blew out the Vikings 40–3. Minnesota quarterback Kirk Cousins was sacked a career-high seven times, and this was the largest road win in Dallas Cowboys' history. The game was so lopsided CBS switched to a "more competitive" game for their national broadcast with five minutes still to play in the third quarter.

Game results

|-
| rowspan=2|
| style="| Cowboys  21–7 
| Cotton Bowl
| Cowboys  1–0
| rowspan=2|Vikings' inaugural season.
|-
| style="| Cowboys  28–0 
| Metropolitan Stadium
| Cowboys  2–0
|-
| 
| style="| Cowboys  28–17 
| Cotton Bowl
| Cowboys  3–0
| 
|-
| 
| style="| Cowboys  20–7 
| Cotton Bowl
| Cowboys  4–0
| Final meeting at Cotton Bowl.
|-

|-
| 
| style="| Vikings  54–13
| Metropolitan Stadium
| Cowboys  4–1
| First start in the series for Roger Staubach.
|-
! 1971 playoffs
! style="| Cowboys  20–12
! Metropolitan Stadium
! Cowboys  5–1
! NFC Divisional Round. Cowboys win Super Bowl VI.
|-
! 1973 playoffs
! style="| Vikings  27–10
! Texas Stadium
! Cowboys  5–2
! NFC Championship Game. First meeting at Texas Stadium. Vikings lose Super Bowl VIII.
|-
| 
| style="| Vikings  23–21
| Texas Stadium
| Cowboys  5–3
| Vikings lose Super Bowl IX.
|-
! 1975 playoffs
! style="| Cowboys  17–14
! Metropolitan Stadium
! Cowboys  6–3
! NFC Divisional Round (Hail Mary Game). Cowboys lose Super Bowl X.
|-
| 
| style="| Cowboys  16–10(OT)
| Metropolitan Stadium
| Cowboys  7–3
|
|-
! 1977 playoffs
! style="| Cowboys  23–6
! Texas Stadium
! Cowboys  8–3
! NFC Championship Game. Cowboys win Super Bowl XII.
|-
| 
| style="| Vikings  21–10
| Texas Stadium
| Cowboys  8–4
| Cowboys lose Super Bowl XIII.
|-
| 
| style="| Cowboys  36–20
| Metropolitan Stadium
| Cowboys  9–4
| Final meeting at Metropolitan Stadium. Final start in the series for Roger Staubach.
|-

|-
| 
| style="| Vikings 31–27
| Metrodome
| Cowboys  9–5
| First meeting at Metrodome.
|-
| 
| style="| Cowboys  37–24
| Metrodome
| Cowboys  10–5
| 
|-
| 
| style="| Vikings 44–38(OT)
| Texas Stadium
| Cowboys  10–6
|
|-
| 
| style="| Vikings  43–3
| Texas Stadium
| Cowboys  10–7
| 
|-

|-
| 
| style="| Cowboys  37–20
| Metrodome
| Cowboys  11–7
| First start in series for Troy Aikman. Cowboys win Super Bowl XXVIII.
|-
| 
| style="| Cowboys  23–17(OT) 
| Metrodome
| Cowboys  12–7
| Cowboys win Super Bowl XXX.
|-
! 1996 playoffs
! style="| Cowboys  40–15
! Texas Stadium
! Cowboys  13–7
! NFC Wild Card Round.
|-
| 
| style="| Vikings  46–36 
| Texas Stadium
| Cowboys  13–8
| Thanksgiving game
|-
| 
| style="| Vikings  27–17 
| Metrodome
| Cowboys  13–9
|
|-
! 1999 playoffs
! style="| Vikings  27–10 
! Metrodome
! Cowboys  13–10
! NFC Wild Card Round.
|-

|-
| 
| style="| Vikings  27–15 
| Texas Stadium
| Cowboys  13–11
| Last start in the series for Troy Aikman. Thanksgiving game.
|-
| 
| style="| Vikings  35–17 
| Metrodome
| Cowboys  13–12
| 
|-
| 
| style="| Cowboys  24–14 
| Texas Stadium
| Cowboys  14–12
| Final meeting at Texas Stadium.
|-
! 2009 playoffs
! style="| Vikings  34–3 
! Metrodome
! Cowboys  14–13
! NFC Divisional Round. Last postseason meeting to date.
|-

|-
| 
| style="| Vikings  24–21
| Metrodome
| Tie  14–14
| Final meeting at Metrodome.
|-
| 
| style="| Cowboys  27–23
| AT&T Stadium
| Cowboys  15–14
| First meeting at AT&T Stadium.
|-
| 
| style="| Cowboys  17–15
| U.S. Bank Stadium
| Cowboys  16–14
| First meeting at U.S. Bank Stadium.
|-
| 
| style="| Vikings  28–24
| AT&T Stadium
| Cowboys  16–15
| 
|-

|-
| 
| style="| Cowboys  31–28
| U.S. Bank Stadium
| Cowboys  17–15
| 
|-
| 
| style="| Cowboys  20–16
| U.S. Bank Stadium
| Cowboys  18–15
| 
|-
| 
| style="| Cowboys  40–3
| U.S. Bank Stadium
| Cowboys  19–15
|
|-

|-
| Regular season
| style="| 
| Vikings 7–5
| Cowboys 10–5
| 
|-
| Postseason
| style="| 
| 
| Tie 2–2
| NFC Wild Card Round: 1996, 1999. NFC Divisional Round: 1971, 1975, 2009. NFC Championship Game: 1973, 1977.
|-
| Regular and postseason 
| style="| 
| 
| 
|

See also
 Hail Mary Pass
 Herschel Walker trade

References

National Football League rivalries
Dallas Cowboys
Minnesota Vikings
Dallas Cowboys rivalries
Minnesota Vikings rivalries